The Two Girls or Les deux gamines may refer to:

 The Two Girls (1921 film), a French silent drama film
 The Two Girls (1936 film), a French drama film and a sound film remake of the previous
 The Two Girls (1951 film), a French drama film and a remake of the two previous